Élise Trynkler (born 19 December 1992) is a French athlete. She competed in the women's 4 × 400 metres relay event at the 2019 World Athletics Championships.

References

External links
 

1992 births
Living people
French female sprinters
Place of birth missing (living people)
World Athletics Championships athletes for France
European Games competitors for France
Athletes (track and field) at the 2019 European Games